Brachydora is a genus of beetles in the family Buprestidae, containing the following species:

 Brachydora crassa Thery, 1937
 Brachydora deformis (Fairmaire, 1901)
 Brachydora granulum (Fairmaire, 1902)
 Brachydora monstrum Obenberger, 1923
 Brachydora sicardi (Thery, 1912)

References

Buprestidae genera